Sir John Anderson, 1st Baronet (8 May 1878 – 11 April 1963) was a Scottish businessman, writer and lecturer.

He was born in Glasgow and educated at Allan Glen's School and the University of Glasgow. He entered the family road haulage business, P. & W. A. Anderson Ltd, and became managing director. He was created a baronet, of Harrold Priory in the County of Bedford, in the 1920 Birthday Honours.

Footnotes

References
Obituary, The Times, 13 April 1963

	

1878 births
1963 deaths
Businesspeople from Glasgow
Scottish businesspeople
Scottish writers
Alumni of the University of Glasgow
Baronets in the Baronetage of the United Kingdom
People educated at Allan Glen's School
Place of death missing